The Ơ Đu (O'du) are an aboriginal ethnic group in Vietnam and Laos. Their total population is more than 570.

Name variation
The Ơ Đu are also commonly referred to as O'Du, O Du, Iduh, Tay Hat, Hat, and Haat.

Culture
The Ơ Đu subsist mainly on slash-and-burn agriculture and raising cattle, augmented by hunting, gathering, and weaving.

Language
The Ơ Đu have a language also called O'du, which is a Khmuic language. The Khmuic languages are Austro-Asiatic. There is some debate as to whether the Khmuic languages are of the Mon–Khmer branch, but the majority opinion is that they are not. Most Ơ Đu presently speak Thai.

Geographic distribution
Population in Laos:  194 in Xiangkhouang Province
Population in Vietnam:  301 in Tương Dương district of the Nghệ An Province (North Central Coast region)

See also 
 List of ethnic groups in Vietnam
 List of ethnic groups in Laos

References

External links 
 http://projekt.ht.lu.se/rwaai RWAAI (Repository and Workspace for Austroasiatic Intangible Heritage)
 http://hdl.handle.net/10050/00-0000-0000-0003-93EF-1@view Iduh in RWAAI Digital Archive

Ethnic groups in Vietnam
Khmuic peoples